Amalie Marie Friederike Auguste (10 August 1794 – 18 September 1870), Princess of Saxony, full name Maria Amalia Friederike Augusta Karolina Ludovica Josepha Aloysia Anna Nepomucena Philippina Vincentia Franziska de Paula Franziska de Chantal, was a German composer writing under the pen name A. Serena, and a dramatist under the name Amalie Heiter. She was the daughter of Prince Maximilian of Saxony and Princess Carolina of Parma.

Life
Princess Amalie was the eldest child of Prince Maximilian of Saxony and Princess Carolina of Parma. She was named after her maternal grandmother, Maria Amalia, Duchess of Parma. She was also the granddaughter of Frederick Christian, Elector of Saxony; niece of Frederick Augustus I, King of Saxony and Anthony, King of Saxony; sister of Frederick Augustus II, King of Saxony and John, King of Saxony; and aunt of Albert, King of Saxony and George, King of Saxony.

She lived her entire life in Pillnitz Castle near Dresden, Germany. She was a well-educated and intellectually curious woman who composed chamber music, opera, and sacred music, sang, wrote comedies, and played the harpsichord. Married to Franciscus de Merendonque in 1817.

Amalie was a young girl during the time of the Napoleonic wars and had to flee from her castle several times. She and her family were forced to sleep on straw wherever they could find shelter.  She met Napoleon several times and held a negative opinion of him. When Napoleon observed that she was angry with him because he warred against her family, but that she should and would accustom herself to the situation, she firmly replied that there were some things that can't be accustomed to.

Career

Music
Amalie studied music with Joseph Schuster, Vincenzo Rastrelli, Johann Miksch, Franz Anton Schubert and Carl Maria von Weber.  She began writing music in 1811 and composed numerous operas, popular among the Dresden elite. She published her musical works under the pseudonym A. Serena. Her most popular compositions were her comedic operas. She portrayed her characters with innovation and color. Weber found her "highly talented."

Dramatics
In 1829/30, she published two dramas under the name of Amalie Heiter. Among her subsequent dramatic works, which were noted for a love of humanity and virtue, her comedies Der Onkel (“The Uncle”) and Die Fürstenbraut (“The Prince's bride”) became very popular. The latter was performed in Paris under the title Une femme charmante (“A charming woman,” 1840). Others of her plays were also adapted to the French stage. A complete edition of her dramatic works was published in Dresden, for the benefit of the women's association, under the title of Originalbeiträge zur deutschen Schaubühne (“Original contributions to the German stage,” 6 vols., 1837–42). A 3rd edition of the 1st volume appeared in 1858, and a French version of it (Comédies) at Paris in 1841. Six of her dramas were translated into English by Anna Jameson (London, 1846), and six others were translated anonymously (1848).

Musical works
 Una donna (1816)
 Le nozze funeste (1816)
 Le tre cinture (1817)
 Il prigioniere (1820)
 L'americana (1820)
 Elvira (1821)
 Elisa ed Ernesto (1823)
 La fedeltà alla prova (1826)
 Vecchiezza e gioventù (1828)
 Il figlio pentito (1831)
 Il marchesino (1833)
 Die Siegesfahne (operetta, 1834)
 La casa disabitata (1835)

Ancestry

References

Bibliography

Modern works
 Slonimsky, Nicolas, ed. Baker's Biographical Dictionary of Musicians. Vol. 1. New York: Schrimer Books, 2001: 67.
 Women in World History: A Biographical Encyclopedia. Vol. 1. Woodbridge, CT: Yorkin, 1999: 254–255.
 Rieger, Eva, ed. The Norton/Grove Dictionary of Women Composers. New York: W.W. Norton and Company, 1995: 12.

Older sources
 
 
  This is an extract from another publication.

1794 births
1870 deaths
19th-century classical composers
19th-century German composers
19th-century German dramatists and playwrights
19th-century German women writers
Albertine branch
Burials at Dresden Cathedral
German classical composers
German women classical composers
German Roman Catholics
German women dramatists and playwrights
House of Wettin
Musicians from Dresden
Saxon princesses
19th-century women composers